The Saab 92 was the first production car from Saab. The design was very aerodynamic for its time, with a drag coefficient (cx or cw) of 0.30. The entire body was stamped out of one piece of sheet metal and then cut to accommodate doors and windows. Full-scale production started December 12, 1949, based on the prototype Ursaab. All of them were of the Deluxe version. A standard version was advertised, but nobody was interested in buying it so no standard versions were produced.

The transmission had three gears, the first unsynchronised. In order to overcome the problems of oil starvation during overrun (engine braking) for the two-stroke engine, a freewheel device was fitted. The suspension was by torsion bars.

All early Saab 92s were painted in a dark green colour similar to British racing green. According to some sources, Saab had a surplus of green paint from wartime production of airplanes; "All the cars were painted bottle green, a colour that became something of a trade mark for Saab cars. The underlying reason was that the armed forces had bought large quantities of a green cellulose paint for camouflage painting. However, the paint did not suit the terrain and the entire consignment of paint was sold off. Saab bought it and that was why both the aircraft and cars ended up green."

Saab's rally history already started two weeks after the 92 was released, when Saab's head engineer Rolf Mellde entered the Swedish Rally and came second in his class.

Only 700 1950 models were made. In 1951, the German VDO instruments were replaced by American Stewart-Warner components.

In 1952 Greta Molander won the 'Coupe des Dames' of the 0 in a 92, tuned to 35 hp (26 kW). In 1953, the 92B arrived with a much larger rear window and larger luggage space (with an opening lid). It was now available in grey, blue-grey, black and green. In 1954 the Saab 92 got the new Solex 32BI carburetor and a new ignition coil giving 28 hp (21 kW). The US headlights were replaced with Hella units. Another novelty was that a textile roof (semi-cab or cabrio coach) was offered as an option. The colour maroon was also introduced this year. In 1955, it acquired an electric fuel pump and square tail lights installed in the rear fenders. The colours were grey, maroon and a new color, moss green.

The English aviation test pilot 'Bob' Moore, who had helped to develop the Saab Tunnan (J29) jet aircraft, brought a 1955 Saab 92B back to England, when he returned, later to become the first managing director of Saab GB Ltd. This was reputedly the first-ever Saab car imported to the UK.

The Saab 93 was introduced in December 1955, but both the 92B and 93 were produced at the same time, for a while. The last 92 was assembled in late 1956–early 1957. Two new colours, grey-green and beige, were available. A total of 20,128 Saab 92s were made.

The Saab 92 appears on a Swedish postage stamp.

When General Motors in 2008 made a list of their top ten cars, the Saab 92 came in first followed by the Pontiac GTO (1964), the Chevrolet Corvette (1953), the EV1 (1996), the Opel Olympia (1936), the LaSalle (1927), the Chevrolet Bel Air (1955), the Cadillac V16 (1930), the Cadillac Model 30 (1910) and the Cadillac (1912)  This is quite surprising because GM did not own  SAAB until 1989.

References

External links

 Saabmuseum.com

Front-wheel-drive vehicles
92
Compact cars
1950s cars
Cars introduced in 1949
Coupés
Streamliner cars